The Khentii Mountains are a mountain range in the Töv and Khentii Provinces in North Eastern Mongolia.

Geography
The mountain chain overlaps the Khan Khentii Strictly Protected Area and includes Mongolia's sacred mountain, Burkhan Khaldun, which is associated with the origin of Genghis Khan. The range forms the watershed between the Arctic Ocean (via Lake Baikal) and the Pacific Ocean basins. Rivers originating in the range include the Onon, Kherlen, Menza and Tuul.

A northern extension of the Khentii Mountains forms a range of the same name which is part of the Khentei-Daur Highlands in the Transbaikalia Krai of Russia.

History
The legendary Mongol Genghis Khan is thought to have chosen a resting place in the Khentii Mountains, called the Great Taboo, or Ikh Khorig, by the Mongols. The area is thought to be where Khan may be entombed.

References

Mountain ranges of Mongolia